Muhammad ibn Mahmud al-Amuli was a medieval Persian physician from Amol, Iran.

He wrote an Arabic commentary on the epitome of Avicenna's The Canon of Medicine that had been made by Yusuf al-Ilaqi.

Between 1335 and 1342, Amoli also composed a large and widely read Persian encyclopedia on the classification of knowledge titled (Nafa'is al-funun fi ‘ara'is al-‘uyun).

See also
List of Iranian scientists

Sources
A.Z. Iskandar, A Catalogue of Arabic Manuscripts on Medicine and Science in the Wellcome Historical Medical Library (London: The Wellcome Historical Medical Library, 1967), p. 37, note 11.
E. Sachau and H. Ethé, Catalogue of the Persian, Turkish, Hindûstânî and Pushtû Manuscripts in the Bodleian Library. Part 1: The Persian Manuscripts (Oxford: Clarendon Press, 1889), col. 909.

For his writings, see:
A.Z. Iskandar, A Catalogue of Arabic Manuscripts on Medicine and Science in the Wellcome Historical Medical Library (London: The Wellcome Historical Medical Library, 1967), p. 52 note 3.
Carl Brockelmann, Geschichte der arabischen Litteratur, 1st edition, 2 vols. (Leiden: Brill, 1889–1936). Second edition, 2 vols. (Leiden: Brill, 1943–49). Page references will be to those of the first edition, with the 2nd edition page numbers given in parentheses, vol. 1, p. 457 (597).
Carl Brockelmann, Geschichte der arabischen Litteratur, Supplement, 3 vols. (Leiden: Brill, 1937–1942), p. 824.
Fateme Keshavarz, A Descriptive and Analytical Catalogue of Persian Manuscripts in the Library of the Wellcome Institute for the History of Medicine (London: Wellcome Institute for the History of Medicine, 1986), p. 539.

14th-century births
14th-century deaths
14th-century Iranian mathematicians
14th-century Iranian physicians
People from Amol